The 2011 World Single Distance Speed Skating Championships were held between 10 and 13 March 2011 in the Max Aicher Arena, Inzell, Germany.

The outdoor ice rink was renovated in 2010 and opened an indoor ice rink in 2011.

Schedule

Medal summary

Men's events

Women's events

Medal table

External links
 
 ISU Results

 
2011 World Single Distance
World Single Distance Speed Skating Championships
World Single Distance, 2011
Sports competitions in Bavaria
2010s in Bavaria
World Single Distance Speed Skating Championships